George Robert Nichols (27 September 1809 – 12 September 1857), also known as Bob Nichols,  was an Australian politician, a member of the New South Wales Legislative Council between 1848 and 1856. He was also a member of the inaugural New South Wales Legislative Assembly for one term from 1856 until his death.

Early life
Nichols was the second son of Isaac Nichols, a former convict who became a successful Sydney businessman and the first postmaster in the colony, and Rosanna Abrahams, daughter of Esther Johnston (also known as Esther Abrahams or Esther Julian). Shortly before his father's death in 1819, Bob Nichols was sent to England for an education and returned to Sydney early in 1823.

On returning to Australia he worked as an articled clerk until he was admitted as the first native-born Australian solicitor on 1 July 1833. Nichols founded the law firm Clayton Utz in February 1833. During this period he was also a journalist and editor of William Wentworth's newspaper The Australian. He was bankrupted in the financial crisis of 1842 but later returned to his legal practice. Nichols was a member of the Parramatta Regional Council, a trustee of Sydney Grammar School and a leading Freemason.

Among the pupils articled to Nichols were James Martin (afterwards Premier and Chief Justice of New South Wales) and Richard Dry (afterwards Premier of Tasmania). Nichols was conceded the privilege, enjoyed by no other practitioner of his grade, of appearing professionally in both the superior and inferior courts of the colony.

Political career
In 1848, prior to the establishment of responsible self-government, Nichols was elected to the semi-elected unicameral Legislative Council. He represented the electorate of Northumberland Boroughs (including Morpeth, West Maitland and East Maitland) until the granting of responsible self-government in 1856. At the first election under the new constitution he was elected to the Legislative Assembly as one of the two members for Northumberland Boroughs and continued to represent the seat until his death on 12 September 1857. Throughout his parliamentary career he was a strong supporter of Wentworth and William Bland.

Nichols served as the Auditor General and as the Secretary for Lands and Works, the inaugural such roles in the first responsible self-government in New South Wales. He held these positions for 80 days in the government of Stuart Donaldson.

Personal life
Nichols married Eliza Boggs on 23 March 1831 and they had son, also called George Robert (1830–1832), and a daughter, Georgiana Eliza (1832–1921). Eliza Boggs died on 16 February 1835 (aged 22).

He married Susannah Eliza Barnes on 16 December 1837 and they had a son, Francis Stephen (1840–1893). Susannah Eliza died on 12 November 1846 (aged 30).

Nichols married for a third time, this time to 18-year old Eliza Smith on 14 July 1854.

Bob died from dropsy on 12 September 1857 (aged 47). and was survived by Eliza (who died on 21 July 1863, aged 27) and by two children.

References

 

1809 births
1857 deaths
Members of the New South Wales Legislative Assembly
Members of the New South Wales Legislative Council
19th-century Australian politicians
Australian newspaper editors
Australian newspaper proprietors
19th-century Australian journalists
19th-century Australian male writers
Burials at Rookwood Cemetery
19th-century Australian businesspeople
Australian male journalists